Hollywood Heights may refer to:

In geography
Hollywood Heights, Los Angeles, a neighborhood in Los Angeles, California
Hollywood Heights, Dallas, a neighborhood in Dallas, Texas
Hollywood Heights, Collinsville, a neighborhood in Collinsville, Illinois

In media and entertainment
Hollywood Heights (TV series), TV drama which aired in 2012